The Valdostan regional election of 2013 confirmed the incumbent autonomist centre-right coalition government, led by the Valdostan Union which retained its absolute majority in the Regional Council of Aosta Valley. The coalition lost 14% percentage points compared to 2008 to the Autonomist centre-left coalition, however.

Results
The Valdostan regional election of 2013 took place on 26 May 2013 in the Aosta Valley. The incumbent coalition government, by the Valdostan Union together with autonomist Edelweiss (SA) and the Autonomist Federation retained its majority in the Regional Council of Aosta Valley for the 8th time in a row. Since 2008, the coalition lost 14 percentage points to the Autonomist centre-left coalition, composed mainly by the Progressive Valdotanian Union (UVP) and the Autonomy Liberty Participation Ecology, ALPE). The center-left coalition grew from 27.4% of the vote to 40.5%

In March 2017, SA left the government and, along with the UVP, Autonomy Liberty Participation Ecology (ALPE) and For Our Valley (PNV), formed a new government without the UV, under President Pierluigi Marquis (SA).

References

2013 elections in Italy
Elections in Aosta Valley
May 2013 events in Italy